The 2021–22 SMU Mustangs men's basketball team represented Southern Methodist University during the 2021–22 NCAA Division I men's basketball season. The Mustangs were led by sixth-year head coach Tim Jankovich and played their home games at Moody Coliseum on their campus in University Park, Texas as members of the American Athletic Conference. They finished the season 24–9, 13–4 in AAC play to finish in second place. They defeated Tulsa in the quarterfinals of the AAC tournament before losing to Memphis in the semifinals. They received an at-large bid to the National Invitation Tournament as a No. 1 seed. They defeated Nichols in the first round before losing to Washington State in the second round.

On March 22, 2022, head coach Tim Jankovich announced his retirement from coaching. On March 27, the school named Georgia State head coach Rob Lanier the team's new head coach.

Previous season
In a season limited due to the ongoing COVID-19 pandemic, the Mustangs finished the 2020–21 season 11–6, 7–4 in AAC play to finish in fourth place. They lost in the quarterfinals of the AAC tournament to Cincinnati. They were invited to the NIT where they lost in the first round to Boise State.

Offseason

Departures

Incoming Transfers

2021 recruiting class

2022 Recruiting class

Roster

Schedule and results

|-
!colspan=12 style=| Non-conference regular season

|-
!colspan=12 style=| AAC Regular Season

|-
!colspan=12 style=| AAC tournament

|-
!colspan=12 style=| NIT
|-

Source

References

SMU Mustangs men's basketball seasons
Smu
SMU